The Golden Square Football Netball Club, nicknamed the Bulldogs, is an Australian rules football and netball club based in the Bendigo suburb of Golden Square, Victoria. 

The club teams currently compete in the Bendigo Football Netball League. The senior football squad has participated in the league since 1935.

Premierships
 BFL (17): 1938, 1939, 1945, 1964, 1965, 1972, 1975, 1976, 1979, 1988, 1989, 2001, 2009, 2010, 2011, 2012, 2013

Notable players
Nathan Brown (2001 and 2002 All-Australian forward)
Wayne Campbell (2000–2004 Richmond captain)
Peter McConville (1979, 1981 and 1982 Carlton premiership player)
Greg Williams (1986 and 1994 Brownlow Medallist)
Rick Ladson (2008 Hawthorn Premiership Player)
• Jye Caldwell

• Jack Ginnivan

References

External links
 Official website

Sports clubs established in 1935
Australian rules football clubs established in 1935
Bendigo Football League clubs
1935 establishments in Australia
Netball teams in Victoria (Australia)